Immortal is the debut solo album by Beth Hart. It was listed as released by Beth Hart Band.

Track listing

 "Run" (Beth Hart, Jimmy Khoury)
 "Spiders in My Bed" (Hart)
 "Isolation" (Hart, Khoury, Tal Herzberg) 	
 "Hold Me Through the Night" (Hart, Khoury)
 "State of Mind" (Hart, Khoury, Herzberg)
 "Burn Chile" (Hart, Khoury, Herzberg)
 "Immortal" (Hart, Khoury, Herzberg)
 "Summer Is Gone" (Hart)
 "Ringing" (Hart, Khoury, Herzberg)
 "God Bless You" (Hart, Khoury)
 "Am I the One" (Hart)
 "Blame the Moon" (Geoffrey Tozer)

Personnel
Beth Hart Band
Beth Hart - vocals, piano; additional bass on "Isolation"
Jimmy Khoury - electric and acoustic guitar; piano on "God Bless You"
Tal Herzberg - bass
Sergio Gonzalez - drums, percussion
with:
Luis Conte - percussion
David Foster - piano on "Hold Me Through the Night"
Claude Gaudette - strings on "Hold Me Through the Night"

References

1996 debut albums
Beth Hart albums
albums produced by Hugh Padgham
albums produced by David Foster
Atlantic Records albums